Nikolay Genov (born ) is a Bulgarian road and track cyclist. He competed at the 2016 UEC European Track Championships in the team sprint event and scratch event.

Major results
2014
 7th Overall Belgrade Trophy Milan Panić
 10th Overall Memorial Dimitar Yankov
2016
 National Under-23 Road Championships
2nd Time trial
3rd Road race
2018
 4th Time trial, National Road Championships
2021
 3rd Time trial, National Road Championships
 3rd Overall Tour du Cameroun
1st Mountains classification
2022
 National Road Championships
1st  Time trial
4th Road race

References

External links

1997 births
Living people
Bulgarian male cyclists
Bulgarian track cyclists
Place of birth missing (living people)